The Universal Character Set (Universal Coded Character Set, UCS, Unicode) is a standard set of characters defined by the international standard ISO/IEC 10646, Information technology — Universal Coded Character Set (UCS) (plus amendments to that standard), which is the basis of many character encodings, improving as characters from previously unrepresented typing systems are added. 

Universal Character Set can also refer to
 Universal Character Set feature for impact printers